Cataclysta ambahonalis is a moth in the family Crambidae. It was described by Hubert Marion in 1954. It is found on Madagascar.

References

Acentropinae
Moths described in 1954